Mijan-e Olya (also Romanized as Mījān-e ‘Olyā; also known as Mījān and Mījān-e Bālā) is a village in Rezvan Rural District, Jebalbarez District, Jiroft County, Kerman Province, Iran. At the 2006 census, its population was 179, in 39 families.

References 

Populated places in Jiroft County